Dental may refer to:
 Dental consonant, in phonetics
 Dental Records, an independent UK record label
 Dentistry, oral medicine
 Teeth

See also 

 Dental care (disambiguation)
 Dentist (disambiguation)
 Tooth (disambiguation)